He Yunfeng (January 1922 – January 6, 2013) was a People's Republic of China major general and People's Republic of China politician. He was born in Pingchang County, Bazhong, Sichuan Province. In March 1933, at the age of 11, he joined the Chinese Workers' and Peasants' Red Army and participated in the Long March. During the Second Sino-Japanese War, he fought in the Hundred Regiments Offensive. During the Chinese Civil War, he participated in the Shangdang Campaign, Linfen-Fushan Campaign, Huaihai Campaign. After the creation of the People's Republic of China, he served as Communist Party of China Committee Secretary and Mayor of Chongqing.

1922 births
2013 deaths
People's Republic of China politicians from Sichuan
Chinese Communist Party politicians from Sichuan
People's Liberation Army generals from Sichuan
Mayors of Chongqing
Political office-holders in Chongqing
Politicians from Bazhong